Smolensk Oblast, also known as Smolenschina, is a federal subject of Russia (an oblast). Its administrative centre is the city of Smolensk. As of the 2010 Census, its population was 985,537.

Geography

The oblast was founded on 27 September 1937. It borders Pskov Oblast in the north, Tver Oblast in the northeast, Moscow Oblast in the east, Kaluga Oblast in south, Bryansk Oblast in the southwest, and Mogilev and Vitebsk Oblasts of Belarus, in the west and northwest, as part of the Belarus–Russia border.

Hydrography
The main river of the region is the Dnieper River and its tributaries, Desna, Vop, Vyazma. By the rivers of the Volga basin and its tributary Vazuza Gzhat and tributary of the Oka river, Ugra. To the north-west flows a short section of the Western Dvina River and its tributary river Kasplya .

Among the major reservoirs supplying water are Moscow Vazuzssky Yauza and reservoirs in the north-east, as well as cooling power plants, Smolensk reservoir in the north near the village of Lake and Desnogorsk Reservoir in the south area of the city near the Desnogorsk .

Climate
The climate of Smolensk Oblast is humid continental, similar to the climate of Moscow Oblast, but slightly warmer in winter due to being located further west. Summers are short, warm and rainy, while winters are long, cold and snowy.

Politics

During the Soviet period, the high authority in the oblast was shared between three persons: The first secretary of the Smolensk CPSU Committee (who in reality had the biggest authority), the chairman of the oblast Soviet (legislative power), and the Chairman of the oblast Executive Committee (executive power). Since 1991, CPSU lost all the power, and the head of the Oblast administration, and eventually the governor was appointed/elected alongside elected regional parliament.

The Charter of Smolensk Oblast is the fundamental law of the region. The Legislative Assembly of Smolensk is the province's standing legislative (representative) body. The Legislative Assembly exercises its authority by passing laws, resolutions, and other legal acts and by supervising the implementation and observance of the laws and other legal acts passed by it. The highest executive body is the Oblast Government, which includes territorial executive bodies such as district administrations, committees, and commissions that facilitate development and run the day to day matters of the province. The Oblast administration supports the activities of the Governor who is the highest official and acts as guarantor of the observance of the oblast Charter in accordance with the Constitution of Russia.

Administrative divisions

Smolensk Oblast is divided into 25 districts (raions) and two cities, which are further divided into 15 towns, 12 urban-type settlements, and 302 rural okrugs.

Demographics
Population: 

 2012
 Births: 10 289 (10.5 per 1000)
 Deaths: 16 318 (16.7 per 1000) 
 Total fertility rate:
2009: 1.40 | 2010: 1.38 | 2011: 1.40 | 2012: 1.43 | 2013: 1.48 | 2014: 1.53 | 2015: 1.52 | 2016: 1.52(e)

According to the 2010 Census, the ethnic composition of the oblast was as follows:
Russians: 94.6%
Ukrainians: 1.3%
Belarusians: 1.3%
Armenians: 0.5%
Others: 2.3%
41,457 people were registered from administrative databases, and could not declare an ethnicity. It is estimated that the proportion of ethnicities in this group is the same as that of the declared group.

Religion

According to a 2012 survey 19.5% of the population of Smolensk Oblast adheres to the Russian Orthodox Church, 7% are unaffiliated generic Christians, 3% are Orthodox Christian believers who do not belong to church or belong to other (non-Russian) Orthodox churches, 2% are Old Believers, 1% are adherents of the Slavic native faith (Rodnovery) movement, 0.4% are members of the Catholic Church. In addition, 45% of the population declares to be "spiritual but not religious", 13% is atheist, and 9.1% follows other religions or did not give an answer to the question.

Notable people
 Isaac Asimov (1920–1992), an American writer and professor of biochemistry, born in Petrovichi
 Yuri Gagarin (1934–1968) a Soviet pilot and cosmonaut, born in Klushino
 Shmuel Schneersohn (1834–1882) an Orthodox rabbi, born in Lyubavichi
 Ivan Sidorenko (1919–1994) a Red Army officer and sniper, born in Glinkovsky District
 Andrey Nikolayevich Tikhonov (1906–1993) a Russian mathematician and geophysicist, born in Gagarin 
 Mikhail Tukhachevsky (1893–1937) nicknamed the Red Napoleon by foreign newspapers, a Soviet general

See also
 2010 Polish presidential airplane crash
 Katyn massacre
 List of Chairmen of the Smolensk Oblast Duma

References

Citations

General sources

External links

 
 Official website of Smolensk Oblast
  Official website of Smolensk Oblast
  News of Smolensk Oblast

 
States and territories established in 1937